Flying Regiment 1 ( or LeR 1) was a mixed regiment, incorporating both fighter, reconnaissance and communication squadrons, of the Finnish Air Force during World War II. The unit was disbanded in June 1941, but reformed from the Supplement Flying Regiment on May 3, 1942.

After its deactivation it was formed int No. 2 Wing.

Organization

Winter War
No. 10 Squadron: dive bomber squadron
No. 12 Squadron: reconnaissance squadron
No. 14 Squadron: reconnaissance squadron
No. 16 Squadron: reconnaissance squadron

Continuation War
No. 12 Squadron: reconnaissance squadron
No. 32 Squadron: fighter squadron

Maintenance companies
1st Airfield Company (1. Lentokenttäkomppania or 1.Le.KenttäK)
2nd Airfield Company (2. Lentokenttäkomppania or 2.Le.KenttäK)

The equipment consisted of some 200-240 aircraft, including Curtiss Hawk 75As, Fokker D.XXIs, Morane-Saulnier MS.406s, Gloster Gladiator IIs, Arado 196s, Curtiss P-40M, LaGG-3, Fokker C.Xs, Westland Lysanders, VL Viima IIs, VL Myrsky IIs, Blackburn Ripon IIFs, and Bristol Blenheim Mk.Is.

Bibliography

External links
Lentorykmentti 1 in the Winter War
Lentorykmentti 1 in the Continuation War 1942-44
Lentorykmentti 1 in the Continuation War 1944

Regiments of the Finnish Air Force
Military units and formations of Finland in the Winter War
Continuation War